William Bowen Sarles (October 1, 1906, Viroqua, Wisconsin – November 14, 1987, Madison, Wisconsin) was an American microbiologist. He was the president of the American Society for Microbiology in 1967.

Biography
He graduated from the University of Wisconsin–Madison (UWM) in 1925 with a B.S., in 1927 with an M.S., and in 1931 with a Ph.D. in agricultural bacteriology. His Ph.D. thesis The production of volatile acids by the fermentation of cellulose at high temperatures was supervised by Edwin Broun Fred. From 1927 to 1929 Sarles was an instructor in bacteriology at Kansas State University. From 1930 to 1932 he held an instructorship in bacteriology at Iowa State University. In UMW's department of bacteriology, he was from 1932 to 1936 an assistant professor, from 1936 to 1943 an associate professor, and a full professor to 1945 to 1972, when he retired as professor emeritus. He chaired the department from 1954 to 1968.

During WW II, on a leave of absence from UWM, Sarles served with the rank of Commander in the United States Naval Reserve from 1943 to 1945. For his work as executive officer and technical consultant assigned to the Office of the Special Consultant to the Secretary of War, he was honored in 1945 with the Legion of Merit of the United States. For his wartime service, the British government appointed him to the Honorary Officer Order of the British Empire. In 1959 he was a Carnegie visiting professor of bacteriology at the University of Hawaii.

He was elected in 1933 a fellow of the American Association for the Advancement of Science. After he died, UWM's department of microbiology established a William Bowen Sarles Scholarship.

In 1927 William B. Sarles married Marion E. Reynolds (1903–1973). They had two sons.

Selected publications

Articles

Books

References

External links
 

1906 births
1987 deaths
American microbiologists
University of Wisconsin–Madison alumni
University of Wisconsin–Madison faculty
Fellows of the American Association for the Advancement of Science
People from Viroqua, Wisconsin